WFHR (1320 AM) is a radio station broadcasting and local and statewide based progressive talk format. Licensed to Wisconsin Rapids, Wisconsin, United States, the station serves the Wausau-Stevens Point area. WFHR features programming from the statewide Civic Media Network.

History
The call letters were derived from William F Huffman Sr, owner of The Wisconsin Rapids Daily Tribune, which began broadcasting November 1, 1940. with a day & nighttime power of 250 watts, initially on 1310 kHz, moving to 1340 kHz in March 1941, remaining at that position until late 1959, when the move to the current frequency took place, increasing  daytime power to 5,000 watts.

Over the years, WFHR's programming emphasis has been on Local News, Sports & Information, including the long-running "Kaffee Klatsch" morning call-in program, hosted by Arnie Strope and the Michaels and Morgan Show hosted by JD Michaels and Gary Morgan.  Up until the mid 90s, WFHR's programming also included various music formats; from block programming in the '60s (mostly standards during the day, pop at night), to MOR/Adult Contemporary in the 1970s and early 1980s, along with several variations of Nostalgia and Oldies in the 1980s and early 1990s, using the programming services of Drake-Chenault and later TM Century.  In 1980, WFHR began adding syndicated Talk programming to its roster with Larry King's late night Talk Show from Mutual Radio, switching to  TalkNet From NBC in early 1984, then adding The Doctor Laura Schlessinger program to its afternoon line-up in the mid-1990s.  A CBS Radio affiliate since the fall of 1972, the station initially carried Mutual News & Programming through the mid-1960s, and then, became an affiliate of the ABC Entertainment Network for a few years in the late 1960s and early 1970s. Some Mutual programming was carried in the early '80's due to an agreement to
broadcast The Larry King Show.  
  
Effective April 16, 2021, WFHR and sister station WLJY were sold by Seehafer Broadcasting to Heart of Wisconsin Media, headed by Marcus C. Jaeger. By late November of that year, FM translator W248DE/97.5 signed on, simulcasting programming on 1320 kHz. On January 4, 2022, after moving to new studios, a format change to a 60s-70s oldies format was made, replacing all of the syndicated talk and sports programming.  On August 1, 2022, WFHR changed hands, coming under the ownership of Madison based Civic Media. The format was returned to News/Talk continuing to offer much of the local programing that was offered under the previous ownership as well as retaining the WFHR staff. Most of the music programing was replaced with statewide programing from the Civic Media Network. This ownership and format change also pair WFHR with Wausau based WXCO allowing the stations to share programing specific to Central Wisconsin.

Notable personalities that once worked at WFHR, include Veteran Milwaukee Broadcaster Gordon Hinkley, Television Sportscaster Jay Wilson, Newscaster Bill Bessette, Stand-up Comic Peter Greyy, and National Voice Artist Scott Chapin.  The station is currently owned by Heart of Wisconsin Media LLC, and featured programing from CBS News Radio, CBS Sports Radio and Westwood One.

Previous logo
 (WFHR's logo under former news/talk format)

References

External links

FHR
News and talk radio stations in the United States
Progressive talk radio